József Bihari (1901–1981) was a Hungarian actor.

Selected filmography
 St. Peter's Umbrella (1935)
 Istvan Bors (1939)
 Deadly Spring (1939)
 Duel for Nothing (1940)
 People of the Mountains (1942)
 Song of the Cornfields (1947)
 Különös házasság (1951)
 Under the City (1953)
 Egyiptomi történet (1963)
 Twenty Hours (1965)
 The Upthrown Stone (1969)
 Sons of Fire (1974)
 Magyarok (1978)
 Cserepek (1980)

Bibliography
 Simon, Andrew L. Made in Hungary: Hungarian Contributions to Universal Culture. Simon Publications, 1998.

External links

1901 births
1981 deaths
Hungarian male film actors
People from Covasna County
20th-century Hungarian male actors